Roxana Itatí Latorre (born 10 May 1952, Rosario) is an Argentine Justicialist Party politician. She was a member of the Argentine Senate representing Santa Fe Province from 2001 to 2015.

Latorre was educated in Rosario and worked extensively as a teacher. She served Governor Carlos Reutemann as subsecretary of administrative reform for Santa Fe, then was provincial director of the Third Age 1995–1997.

Latorre was elected as a national deputy for Santa Fe in 1997. She was elected to the Senate in 2001 and was re-elected in 2003 for a six-year term. She attempted to become a candidate for the governorship of Santa Fe against her own party ahead of the 2007 elections but dropped out in July 2007.

In February 2009, after Reutemann, also a Justicialist Senator from Santa Fe and her political mentor, announced he was quitting the pro-government Front for Victory block in the Senate, Latorre followed him and announced her break with the block as well, in a political blow to President Cristina Fernández de Kirchner and her husband, Justicialist Party president, and ex-president of the Republic, Néstor Kirchner.

External links
Senate profile

References

1952 births
Living people
People from Rosario, Santa Fe
Members of the Argentine Senate for Santa Fe
Members of the Argentine Chamber of Deputies elected in Santa Fe
Justicialist Party politicians
Women members of the Argentine Senate
Women members of the Argentine Chamber of Deputies